William John Lunn (8 May 1923 – 19 January 2000) was an footballer from Northern Ireland who played in the Football League for West Bromwich Albion, Bournemouth & Boscombe Athletic and Newport County.

References

Association footballers from Northern Ireland
English Football League players
1936 births
2000 deaths
Glenavon F.C. players
West Bromwich Albion F.C. players
AFC Bournemouth players
Newport County A.F.C. players
Yeovil Town F.C. players
Association football forwards